Sajeeb Group is a Bangladeshi diversified conglomerate based in Dhaka known for their processed foods. Md. Abul Hashem is the Chairperson of the Group.

History 
Sajeeb Group was established in 1982.

Sajeeb Group opened a supershop called One Stop but was forced to close it due to lack of sales.

On 22 June 2015, Bangladesh Police led by Pradip Kumar Das, officer in charge of Bayezid Police Station, raided Sajeeb Group's depot in Chittagong and found expired Tang that they were putting fake expiry dates to sell in the local market.

From 2006 to 2016, Sajeeb Group's sales increased at around 40-50 per year and one-fourth of that sale was to foreign markets. Sajeeb received orders worth US$400,000 at the SIAL Food Fair 2016 in France. Tawsiv Ibrahim is the managing director of the Group's international sales. On 22 July 2016, Detective Branch found rotten mangoes in the vehicles of Hashem Foods Limited which led to a raid on the company's factory in Rishikul union, Godagari Upazila. The raid discovered "200 maunds" of rotten mangoes, which were destroyed, and the factory was fined two hundred thousand taka.

Bangladesh Food Safety Authority test in October 2017 found that Shezan mango drink had 5 percent mango which is less than the mandatory 10 percent needed to be labeled a fruit drink, where as Frutix, a fruit drink of Pran has less than 5% pulp.

Wings Clear Lemon Drink, sister concern of Sajeeb Group, sponsored a futsal tournament for 24 universities in Bangladesh in 2018. The groups makes three soda pops, Wings, Aha, and Popin, which were launched in 2018.

Sajeeb Group saw an eight billion taka decline in beverage sales in 2020 during the COVID-19 pandemic in Bangladesh.

Hashem Foods Limited fire 
On 9 July 2021, a factory of Hashem Foods Limited, sister concern of Sajeeb Group, in Rupganj caught fire resulting in 52 deaths. The factory workers were trapped in the third floor of the factory as the only exit was locked by factory manager, who also died. Narayanganj District Police Chief Jayedul Alam described the fire as "deliberate murder". Abul Hashem, chairperson of the group, was arrested on charges of murder and attempt to murder. The factory was making Shezan juice. The presence of chemicals and flammable substances including polythene and clarified butter contributed to the blaze in the factory, and made it more difficult to bring under control, the state-run Bangladesh Sangbad Sangstha news agency reported. A clash broke out between relatives of missing factory workers and law enforcement; three shotguns were stolen from a Bangladesh Ansar camp.

Businesses 

 Sajeeb Corporation
 Sajeeb Homes Limited
 Sajeeb Foods and Beverage Limited
 Hashem Foods Limited
 Hashem Rice Mills Limited
 Hashem Flour Mills Limited
 Hashem Agro Processing Limited
 Savvy Foods Limited
 MARS International Limited
 Takaful Islami Insurance Limited

References 

1982 establishments in Bangladesh
Organisations based in Dhaka
Conglomerate companies of Bangladesh